Teluk Bintuni Regency (or Bintuni Bay Regency) is a regency of West Papua Province of Indonesia. It covers an area of 18,637 km2, comprising administrative districts on three sides of Bintuni Bay, a gulf that separates the Bird's Head Peninsula and Bomberai Peninsula which together form the main geographical constituents of the province; it had a population of 52,422 at the 2010 Census and 87,083 at the 2020 Census. The administrative centre is the town of Bintuni.

Geography
The Bintuni Bay area is one of the new expansion districts in the province West Papua which was ratified by the Plenary Session of the Indonesian House of Representatives on November 12, 2002. Located between the southern coast of Bird's Head and Onin Peninsula coast, overlooking the Seram Sea off the west coast of West Papua. Adjacent to the narrow neck of the mountain that connects the Bird's Head with other regions in West Papua Province. Geographically the area of ​​Bintuni Bay Regency is between 1°57'50"LS - 3°11'26"LS and 1.9.32°44'59" - 134°14'49"E and is located between Bird's Head south coast and Onin Peninsula north coast overlooking the Seram sea off the west coast of Papua. Administratively, the Bintuni Bay Regency is bordered by:
To the north, it is bordered by Manokwari Regency (Senopi District and Kebar District) and Arfak Mountains Regency (Testega District and Didohu District);
In the west, it is bordered by South Sorong Regency (Kokoda District, North Kokoda District and Kais District) and Maybrat Regency (South Aifat District and East Aifat District);
To the south, it is bordered by Kaimana Regency (Teluk Arguni District) and Fakfak Regency (Bomberay District);
To the east, it is bordered by Teluk Wondama Regency (Kuri Wamesa District, Windesi District, Nikiwar District and Wamesi District) and South Manokwari Regency (Tahota District and Dataran Isim District).

Administrative districts
The regency comprises twenty-four districts (kecamatan), tabulated below with their areas and their populations at the 2010 Census and the 2020 Census. The table also includes the locations of the district centres, the number of administrative villages (desa and kelurahan, 117 in total) in each district and the post code. The first six districts listed below form the northeast part of the Bomberai Peninsula; Wamesa District is situated to the northeast of Bintuni Bay; and the remaining 17 districts lie in the southeast part of the Bird's Head Peninsula.

Note that the figures in the area column appear to contain duplications/errors, but these are the official figures published by BPS.

Villages
 

Muturi

References

External links
Statistics publications from Statistics Indonesia (BPS)

Regencies of West Papua (province)